Domenico Brigaglia (born 12 June 1958 in Sassari) is a former Italian Grand Prix motorcycle road racer. His best year was in 1986 when he won the 125cc Belgian Grand Prix and finished in third place in the 125cc world championship.

References 

1958 births
People from Sassari
Living people
Italian motorcycle racers
125cc World Championship riders
Sportspeople from Sardinia